Eupithecia dissobapta is a moth in the  family Geometridae. It is found in eastern Madagascar.

This species has a wingspan of 13-14mm.

References

Moths described in 1932
dissobapta
Moths of Madagascar